Open Medicine may refer to two medical journals:
Open Medicine (De Gruyter journal), with the ISO abbreviation Open Med. (Wars.), a journal published by De Gruyter Open, known as the Central European Journal of Medicine from 2006-2014.
Open Medicine (John Willinsky journal), with the ISO abbreviation Open Med., a journal published by John Willinsky from 2007–2014.
It may also refer to
SAGE Open Medicine, a journal published by SAGE Publications
Not to be confused with
Open Medicine Journal, a journal published by Bentham Open